Empress Dou may refer to 3 Han dynasty empresses, who all reigned as empresses dowager:

Empress Dou (Wen) (died 135 BC), wife of Emperor Wen of Han and mother of Emperor Jing of Han
Empress Zhangde (died 97), wife of Emperor of Zhang of Han
Empress Dou Miao (died 172), third wife of Emperor Huan of Han

Dou
Dou